Shrek n' Roll is a video game developed by Backbone Entertainment and published by Activision on November 14, 2007. The puzzle game was released on the Xbox 360.

Gameplay 
The gameplay consists of two Shrek characters being positioned at opposite ends of a plank of wood, with a ball-shaped piece of food in the middle. Players must cooperate by manipulating pulleys on their sides to move the plank up a tower, and roll the food to Shrek's ogre babies. Players must avoid letting the ball drop and collect bonus items by rolling the ball over them. The game also offers a versus mode where two players compete to feed an ogre baby at the top of a tower.

Reception
The game has a Metacritic rating of 49% based on 10 critic reviews. TeamXBox said "The gameplay is fun, but not nearly groundbreaking and unlikely to provide hours and hours of entertainment. The graphics are sharp, but nothing that’ll put the Xbox 360 at risk of overheating because the processors are working too hard. " IGN said " Shrek-N-Roll is more boredom and mundane than fun and exhilarating, even for diehard fans of all three Shrek films. " Eurogamer said "The gameplay is repetitive - not a problem for puzzle games if they also have an addictive quality, but Shrek-N-Roll just doesn't." GamesRadar said " Even as a diversion for the younger set, this game just doesn't have any staying power". Official Xbox Magazine said "Local co-op play requires constant communication and generates some small excitement, but isn't enough to make Shrek-n-Roll more than an overpriced novelty." Xbox World 360 Magazine UK said "We'll go easy on it for being a kids' game, but it's certainly not a good one".

References

2007 video games
Shrek video games
Video games developed in the United States
Xbox 360 games
Xbox 360-only games